Volga Township is a township in Clayton County, Iowa, USA.  As of the 2000 census, its population was 551.

History
Volga Township was named from the Volga River (Iowa), which in turn was named after the Volga River in Russia.

Geography
According to the USGS, it contains ten cemeteries: Blanchaine, Communia, Eberhard, Hartshey, Immanuel Lutheran, Krumm, Musfeldt, Old Garber, Saint Michaels and Wolf.

The streams of Bear Creek, Doe Creek, Elk Creek, Honey Creek, Panther Creek, Volga River and Wayman Creek run through this township.

Notes

References
 USGS Geographic Names Information System (GNIS)

External links
 US-Counties.com
 City-Data.com

Townships in Clayton County, Iowa
Townships in Iowa